Series 6 or Season 6 may refer to:

Series 6 exam, officially the Investment Company Products or Variable Life Contracts Representative exam
Apple Watch Series 6, a smartwatch produced by Apple
BMW 6 Series
GeForce 6 series, line of video cards

See also
 600 series (disambiguation)
 System 6